Mathilde Krim (née Galland; July 9, 1926 – January 15, 2018) was a medical researcher and the founding chairman of amfAR, American Foundation for AIDS Research.

Biography
Mathilde Galland was born in Como, Italy to a Swiss Protestant father and Italian Roman Catholic mother. She received her PhD in Biology from the University of Geneva, Switzerland, in 1953. In 1948, she married David Danon, an Israeli man she met at University of Geneva School of Medicine. She converted to Judaism before marriage. They had a daughter and shortly thereafter relocated to Israel.

While living in Switzerland, she assisted members of the Irgun in their efforts to purchase arms from former French resistance members, prior to Israel's independence. After moving to the U.S., she was also very active in collecting donations for Israel.

Medical research career
From 1953 to 1959, she pursued research in cytogenetics and cancer-causing viruses at the Weizmann Institute of Science in Israel, where she was a member of the team that first developed a method for the prenatal determination of sex.

After her divorce, she moved to New York and joined the research staff of Cornell University Medical School, following her 1958 marriage to Arthur B. Krim — a New York attorney, head of United Artists, later founder of Orion Pictures, active member of the Democratic Party, and advisor to Presidents John F. Kennedy, Lyndon Johnson, and Jimmy Carter. On May 19, 1962, the Krims hosted an exclusive celebrity-filled soirée at their home following the 45th birthday party for President John F. Kennedy at Madison Square Garden, including Marilyn Monroe. During the course of their marriage, Arthur and Mathilde Krim were very active in the American civil rights movement, the movements for independence in Rhodesia and South Africa, the gay rights movement, and in numerous other civil liberties and human rights movements.

In 1962, Krim became a research scientist at the Sloan-Kettering Institute for Cancer Research and, from 1981 to 1985, she was the director of its interferon lab. Until recently, she held an academic appointment as Adjunct Professor of Public Health and Management at Columbia University's Mailman School of Public Health.

Soon after the first cases of what would later be called AIDS were reported in 1981, Krim recognized that this new disease raised grave scientific and medical questions and that it might have important socio-political consequences. She dedicated herself to increasing the public's awareness of AIDS and to a better understanding of its cause, its modes of transmission, and its epidemiologic pattern.

Contributing to the fight against AIDS, she established AIDS Medical Foundation in 1983. Later the Foundation merged with a similar organization and called the American Foundation for AIDS Research (AmFAR). With Elizabeth Taylor, she founded the American Foundation for AIDS Research contributing generous amounts of her own funds and lending her considerable skills to raising awareness about AIDS and raising funds for AIDS research. She continued working on behalf of AIDS awareness through AmfAR.

Awards and recognition
Krim was awarded 16 doctorates honoris causa and has received numerous other honors and distinctions. In August 2000, President Bill Clinton awarded her the Presidential Medal of Freedom, the highest civilian honor in the United States, in recognition of her "extraordinary compassion and commitment".

In 2003, Krim received the Award for Greatest Public Service Benefiting the Disadvantaged, an award given out annually by Jefferson Awards.

Death
Krim died at home in Kings Point, New York on January 15, 2018, aged 91.

References

External links

 
 
 
 Mathilde Krim papers, Archives & Special Collections, Columbia University Health Sciences Library

1926 births
2018 deaths
HIV/AIDS activists
Converts to Judaism
Cornell University faculty
Columbia University faculty
University of Geneva alumni
American health activists
HIV/AIDS researchers
Italian emigrants to Israel
Italian emigrants to the United States
Swiss Jews
Presidential Medal of Freedom recipients
Jewish women scientists
People from Como